Ecuador made its Paralympic Games début at the 1976 Summer Paralympics in Toronto, with a small delegation of three competitors in track and field and swimming. The country has participated in every subsequent edition of the Summer Paralympics, except 1980 and 1988, but has never entered the Winter Paralympics. Ecuador's delegations have always been small (never more than four competitors).

On 29 August 2021, the country won its first two Paralympic medals at the 2020 Summer Paralympics through Mendez sisters Poleth Isamar Mendes Sanchez and Anaís Méndez Poleth Mendes won Ecuador's first Paralympic gold medal with a new world record of 14.39 in the women's F20 shot put event during the 2020 Summer Paralympics. Her sister Anaís also won bronze medal in the same discipline making it a rare instance of athletes coming from same family who go on to win medals in a same competition. Prior to the 2020 Summer Paralympics, Ecuador had never won a Paralympic medal.

Medalists

See also
 Ecuador at the Olympics

References